The 1954 Ohio State Buckeyes football team represented the Ohio State University in the 1954 Big Ten Conference football season.  The team was led by quarterback Dave Leggett and captains John Borton and Dick Brubaker. They were the second national title team in Ohio State football history. They were coached by Hall of Fame coach Woody Hayes. The Buckeyes were awarded the title by the AP Poll and represented the Big Ten Conference in the Rose Bowl.

The Buckeyes finished the 1953 season with a record of 6–3. They were ranked #20 in the preseason AP Poll, but dropped out of the first in-season poll, which was issued before their season opener. However, six weeks later, the Buckeyes had risen to the top of the AP Poll. Their rise from unranked to #1 in six weeks stood as an AP Poll record for 60 years until being broken by Mississippi State in 2014. The Buckeyes defeated six ranked teams to capture their first league title under fourth year Coach Hayes.

Led by their powerful defense, the Bucks beat the #2 Wisconsin Badgers and their eventual Heisman Trophy winner Alan Ameche on an 88-yard interception return by  Howard "Hopalong" Cassady, who won the award the following year.  The Buckeye defense forced 35 turnovers during the season and allowed only two teams to score more than one touchdown

In their game against the Michigan Wolverines, the Bucks held a goal-line stand and then drove 99 yards for a touchdown. The AP Poll declared the Bucks to be number one while the UPI Coaches Poll opted for the 9–0,  Pacific Coast Conference champion the UCLA Bruins. However, because of the "no repeat rule" the Bruins were locked out of the Rose Bowl leaving the Buckeyes to play second place USC.

The 1955 Rose Bowl was played during a rainstorm in poor field conditions. However, Ohio State managed to gain 304 yards and hold the Trojans to only six first downs. USC's only score came on an 86-yard punt return.  The team finished 10–0 for the first time in school history.

Schedule

Game Summaries

Indiana

California

Illinois

Iowa

Wisconsin

Northwestern

Pittsburgh

Purdue

Michigan

Southern California

Coaching staff

 Woody Hayes – Head Coach – 4th year

All-Americans
 Dean Dugger, E
 Howard Cassady, HB (Team MVP)
 Jim Reichenbach, G

All-Big Ten
 Dean Dugger, E
 Howard Cassady, HB
 Francis Machinsky, T
 Dick Hilinski

1955 NFL draftees

References

Ohio State
Ohio State Buckeyes football seasons
College football national champions
Big Ten Conference football champion seasons
Rose Bowl champion seasons
College football undefeated seasons
Ohio State Buckeyes football